Starbuck is a 2011 Canadian comedy film directed by Ken Scott and written by Scott and Martin Petit. It stars Patrick Huard (Bon Cop, Bad Cop) as the main character, Antoine Bertrand as his friend/lawyer, and Julie Le Breton as his girlfriend.

The film's title refers to a Canadian Holstein bull, named Hanoverhill Starbuck, who produced hundreds of thousands of progeny by artificial insemination in the 1980s and 1990s.

Plot
In a 1988 prologue, David Wozniak is at a Quebec sperm bank making a donation. Twenty-three years later, in 2011, he is a hapless deliveryman for his family's butcher shop, pursued by thugs to whom he owes $80,000. His girlfriend Valérie is pregnant with his child. One day, David returns from work to find a lawyer from the sperm bank who tells him he has fathered 533 children. Of those, 142 have joined a class action lawsuit to force the fertility clinic to reveal the identity of "Starbuck", the alias he used as a sperm donor.

David's friend and lawyer represents him as he tries to keep the records sealed. He provides David with profiles of each party to the lawsuit: David tracks down several of them, finding moments for providing help or encouragement. One is a severely disabled young man he visits in an institution. At one point, tailing one of them, David finds himself at a meeting of the plaintiffs in the lawsuit against him. David decides to identify himself, but after the thugs assault his father, he agrees with his lawyer to sue the sperm bank for damages. He wins the lawsuit, receives $200,000, and keeps his identity secret.

David has regrets, but his lawyer advises him that revealing his identity would require him to return the money he won from the lawsuit. After his father gives him his share of the family business so he can pay off his debt, David sends an e-mail identifying himself to the media. He goes to Valerie's house as she is going into premature labour. At the hospital, his baby is born, he proposes to Valerie, and many of the children show up to see him.

Cast
 Patrick Huard as David Wozniak/Starbuck
 Antoine Bertrand as David's lawyer
 Julie Le Breton as Valérie
 Sarah-Jeanne Labrosse as Julie
 Igor Ovadis as David's father, an immigrant from Poland.
 Dominic Philie as Frère sombre
 Marc Bélanger as Frère sympathique
 David Michaël as Antoine
 Patrick Martin as Étienne
 David Giguère as speaker

Reception
Starbuck was screened at the 2011 Toronto International Film Festival on 14–15 September 2011, where it was runner-up for the People's Choice Award. It was chosen "Most Popular Canadian Film" at the 2011 Vancouver International Film Festival.

In September 2011, Chris Knight, the chief film critic for the National Post, called it a "sparkling crowd-pleaser" based on a "ludicrous premise, sure. But Scott's pithy script (co-written by Martin Petit), linked to Huard's likeable layabout, makes the whole thing as easy to take as candy from a baby."

Upon its November 2012 UK release, Peter Bradshaw of The Guardian gave it two stars out of five, and called it a "lame comedy-drama" that loses "almost all the charm of the real story...through the contrivances and overacting."

Box office
The film was the most successful Quebec-made film within the province in 2011, bringing in $3,399,338 in box office revenue for the year.

Remakes
A French remake, Fonzy, was released in France on 30 October 2013. José Garcia played the lead character.

Scott co-wrote and directed an American remake, Delivery Man. It was produced by DreamWorks Pictures, and Vince Vaughn played the lead character. It was released on 22 November 2013.

References

External links
  (France)
 
 
 

2011 films
2011 comedy films
Canadian comedy films
Films directed by Ken Scott
Films set in Montreal
Films set in 1988
Films set in 2011
Films shot in Montreal
Canadian independent films
Films about sperm donation
French-language Canadian films
Spanish-language Canadian films
2010s Canadian films
Canadian pregnancy films
2011 multilingual films
2010s French-language films
2010s Spanish-language films
2011 independent films
Canadian multilingual films